Colin Gregory defeated Bob Schlesinger 6–2, 6–2, 5–7, 6–4 in the final to win the men's singles tennis title at the 1929 Australian Championships.

Seeds
The seeded players are listed below. Colin Gregory is the champion; others show the round in which they were eliminated.

 Jack Crawford (quarterfinals)
 Bunny Austin (quarterfinals)
 Harry Hopman (semifinals)
 Colin Gregory (champion)
 Bob Schlesinger (finalist)
 Jack Cummings (second round)
n/a 
 Gar Moon (semifinals)

Draw

Key
 Q = Qualifier
 WC = Wild card
 LL = Lucky loser
 r = Retired

Finals

Earlier rounds

Section 1

Section 2

Notes

References

External links
 
  Source for seedings

1929
1929 in Australian tennis
Men's Singles